Italo Righi (born 5 June 1959) is a Sammarinese politician who was a Captain Regent, from 1 April 2012 to 1 October 2012, with Maurizio Rattini.

References

1959 births
Captains Regent of San Marino
Members of the Grand and General Council
Living people
Italian politicians
Italian people of Sammarinese descent